Vinti may refer to:
'
John P. Vinti (1907–1990), American theoretical physicist
Natalie Vinti (born 1988), Mexican-American soccer player
I Vinti, 1953 Italian film
Vinti Prize, Italian mathematics award